Boy with a Dragon is a  white marble sculpture, now in the Getty Museum, which has owned it since 1987. It draws on the myth of the infant Hercules strangling serpents sent to kill him.

It was carved by Pietro Bernini and his son Gian Lorenzo Bernini for Maffeo Barberini (later Pope Urban VIII). In 1702 Urban's grand-nephew Carlo Barberini presented the work to Philip V of Spain on the latter's entry into Naples.

External links
http://www.getty.edu/art/collection/objects/1155/pietro-bernini-and-gian-lorenzo-bernini-boy-with-a-dragon-italian-about-1617/
https://books.google.com/books?id=u-i5ZGtbckMC&pg=PA77

Sculptures by Gian Lorenzo Bernini
1610s sculptures
Sculptures of the J. Paul Getty Museum
Marble sculptures in the United States
Sculptures of dragons
Sculptures of children
Sculptures in California